In Greek mythology, Euonymus (Ancient Greek: Εὐώνυμος means 'well-named', a euphemistic epithet) was the son of Gaia by Uranus or Cephissus. He was the eponym of the deme Euonymeia, Attica, whereas his daughter Aulis gave her name to the city Aulis, Boeotia.

Note

References 

 Stephanus of Byzantium, Stephani Byzantii Ethnicorum quae supersunt, edited by August Meineike (1790-1870), published 1849. A few entries from this important ancient handbook of place names have been translated by Brady Kiesling. Online version at the Topos Text Project.

Children of Gaia
Demigods in classical mythology
Attican characters in Greek mythology